Henrik Jensen (born 25 October 1959) is a Danish former football player and manager. He managed Danish Superliga club Brøndby IF between 2010 and 2011, and Boldklubben Frem of the 2nd Division between 2012 and 2014.

Henrik Jensen is the father of APOEL player Mike Jensen.

Career
Jensen spent his active career with Danish clubs Vanløse IF, Hvidovre IF, and Brøndby IF, winning the Danish championship with Brøndby. He played one game for the Denmark national football team in June 1982.

Jensen has managed Superliga clubs Køge Boldklub, Akademisk Boldklub, and AC Horsens, being relegated with all three clubs. On 26 March 2010 Brøndby IF officials hired the coach to replace Kent Nielsen, who had been dismissed following the 1–3 home defeat against HB Køge the day before.

He was sacked as manager of Brøndby on 24 October 2011 following a miserable start of the 2011-12 season.

In June 2012 he was named new manager of Boldklubben Frem in the Danish 2nd Divisions. He left the club by mutual consent on 29 April 2014.

References

External links
 Danish national team profile
 Superliga manager statistics
 Superliga player statistics

1959 births
Living people
Danish men's footballers
Denmark international footballers
Denmark under-21 international footballers
Denmark youth international footballers
Danish football managers
Hvidovre IF players
Brøndby IF players
Køge Boldklub managers
Akademisk Boldklub managers
AC Horsens managers
Brøndby IF managers
Association football forwards
Danish Superliga managers
Boldklubben Frem managers
Footballers from Copenhagen
Brøndby IF non-playing staff